Richard George Wilson (born 19 May 1953) is a former New Zealand rugby union player. A fullback, Wilson represented Canterbury at a provincial level, and was a member of the New Zealand national side, the All Blacks, from 1976 to 1980. He played 25 matches for the All Blacks including two full internationals.

References

1953 births
Living people
People educated at St Andrew's College, Christchurch
New Zealand rugby union players
New Zealand international rugby union players
Canterbury rugby union players
Rugby union fullbacks
People from Leeston
Rugby union players from Canterbury, New Zealand